Typhoon Nelson, known in the Philippines as Typhoon Bising, was the second tropical cyclone to strike the Philippines within a week in March 1982. Nelson originated from a tropical disturbance southeast of Guam towards the middle of March. Although the system was initially poorly organized, it developed rather quickly, and was upgraded into Tropical Storm Nelson on March 19. It tracked westward, and fluctuated in intensity for several days. On March 24, Typhoon Nelson intensified into a typhoon, and entered an episode of rapid intensification. On March 27, the typhoon entered the South China Sea, and the next day, briefly re-intensified before resuming a weakening trend. Nelson dissipated on March 31. Affecting the nation less than a week after Tropical Storm Mamie did, Nelson was responsible for additional flooding across much of the Philippines. Fifty-six people were killed due to the typhoon, eight of whom perished due to drownings. Over 1,200 homes were destroyed. More than 165,000 people fled to shelters, including 83,000 that were displaced from their home. Thirty fishing boats and 23 ferries were destroyed due to the system. Damage amounted to $17.2 million (1982 USD).

Meteorological history

The second of three early season tropical cyclones to form in the West Pacific basin, Typhoon Nelson can be traced back to a low latitude area of disturbed in mid-March. The Japan Meteorological Agency (JMA) started watching the system at 0000 UTC on March 18 while a Tropical Cyclone Formation Alert (TCFA) was issued. Initially, the system was disorganized, but the disturbance was located in a favorable environment aloft and began to develop rapidly. Ten hours after the TCFA, the JTWC upgraded the system into a tropical depression. Early on March 19, the JMA classified the system as a tropical storm. Based on this, the JTWC designated the system as Tropical Storm Nelson.

Nelson tracked westward, staying south of a large subtropical ridge. Despite the aforementioned favorable environment, Nelson briefly weakened late on March 19, but re-intensified slightly the following morning. Shortly thereafter, the JTWC upgraded the system into a typhoon. Further intensification was halted due to increased easterly wind shear, and the storm began to level off in intensity as it accelerated on a westward course. On March 21, the JMA declared Nelson a severe tropical storm. According to the JTWC, the storm fluctuated between tropical storm and typhoon status for about 60 hours, even though the JMA suggest that Nelson did not become a typhoon until March 24. Around this time, the Philippine Atmospheric, Geophysical and Astronomical Services Administration (PAGASA) also started monitoring the storm, assigning it with the local name Bising.

After becoming a typhoon, Nelson forward's speed began to slow down as the storm began to move away from the ridge and encounter more conducive conditions. Shortly thereafter, the storm moved ashore in the Philippine at peak intensity. After making landfall, Nelson weakened over the south-central portion of the nation.

By March 27, Nelson re-emerged into the South China Sea, having weakened considerably, and data from both the JMA and JTWC indicated that Nelson was no longer a typhoon. On the following day, Nelson resumed weakening due to increased wind shear. Despite the presence of a trough, Nelson did not recurve northeast, and instead meandered westward. On the afternoon of March 31, the JMA ceased watching Nelson.

Preparations and impact
Typhoon Nelson was the second storm to strike the Philippines within a week, following Tropical Storm Mamie, which claimed 54 lives. Considered a "pre-season" storm by newspapers, Nelson required storm warnings for parts of the nation, which were broadcast via radio. Much of the southern section of the Philippines were placed on typhoon alert. Due to the threat of storm surge, residents in coastal areas were advised to evacuate to higher ground.

Typhoon Nelson was responsible for significant flooding across the Philippines. On the offshore Leyte Island, a radio transmitter and a school were destroyed. In Cebu City, schools, businesses, and government offices were closed for a day. Across the low-lying town of Abucay, flooding occurred. A total of 1,261 dwellings were leveled, including 703 houses destroyed in the provinces of Cebu, Bohol, and Surigao, leaving approximately 83,000 people homeless. In Loreto Town, part of the Suriago Province, 95% of all coconut trees were toppled, and all but 45 of the town's 600 houses were demolished. A total of 165,462 persons evacuated to shelters.  Widespread power outages occurred while many bridges were washed away. Shipping and air services were halted; 30 fishing boats and 23 ferries were destroyed. In all, 56 people perished due to Typhoon Nelson. Ten died in the hard-hit Leyte Province. At least eight of the casualties were due to drownings, which included two woman and an infant. Overall, damage from Nelson amounted to $17.2 million, crop and property damage alone totaled $7.4 million.

See also

 List of tropical cyclones
 Typhoon Hagupit (2014)
 Typhoon Lee (1981)
 Typhoon Irma (1981)
Typhoon Rai (2021)

Notes

References

External links

1982 Pacific typhoon season
Typhoons in the Philippines
Typhoons
March 1982 events in Asia
April 1982 events in Asia
Nelson